Amerasinghe or Amarasinghe is a Sinhalese surname.

Notable people
 Felix Amerasinghe (1948–2005), Sri Lankan entomologist
 Gunapala Amarasinghe (born 1954), Sri Lankan academic
 Hamilton Shirley Amerasinghe (1913–1980), Sri Lankan diplomat
 Ishara Amerasinghe (born 1978), Sri Lankan cricketer
 Jayantha Amerasinghe (born 1954), Sri Lankan cricketer
 Karunaratne Amarasinghe, Sri Lankan broadcaster
 Mahendra Amerasinghe, Sri Lankan cricketer
 Malinga Amarasinghe (born 1997), Sri Lankan cricketer
 Niroshana Amarasinghe (born 1982), Sri Lankan cricketer
 P. Amarasinghe (died 2007), Sri Lankan banker
 Rohan Amarasinghe, Sri Lankan navy officer
 Somawansa Amarasinghe (1943–2016), Sri Lankan politician
 Sumana Amarasinghe (born 1948), Sri Lankan actress

See also
 
 

Sinhalese surnames